The U.S. Bank Tower is a 389 ft (119m) tall office skyscraper in Denver, Colorado. It was completed in 1975 and has 26 floors. Minoru Yamasaki & Associates designed the building and it is currently the 19th tallest in Denver. Its facade is clad in white marble with tinted glass, built in the typical modernist style of its day.

See also
List of tallest buildings in Denver
List of works by Minoru Yamasaki

References
Emporis
Skyscraperpage

Bank buildings in Colorado
Skyscraper office buildings in Denver
Office buildings completed in 1975
Minoru Yamasaki buildings
Modernist architecture in Colorado